Suvudu was a genre site created by Random House, to provide additional content, such as author interviews, chats, chapter previews, reviews, previews, and news around science fiction, fantasy, comics, graphic novels, and video game guides and books published by Random House across all of its imprints.

Background & history
Suvudu was launched on July 18, 2008, with the intent of featuring science fiction, fantasy, comics, graphic novels, and gaming titles and authors across all of Random House, Inc.'s, divisions and imprints. Authors and titles from Del Rey, Spectra, Pantheon Books, and Random House Children's Books are frequently featured.

In its introductory post, Suvudu stated it would be a "website catering to news from all sci-fi and fantasy creative media—books, audiobooks, gaming, manga, comic books and movies! Content will include podcasts, videos, reviews, interviews and original blog posts, all brought to you by some of the best talents in the sci-fi, fantasy, graphic novel and gaming industries."

While the site is a property of Random House, Inc., and features titles published by that company prominently, Suvudu has featured authors and works from other publishing companies. Suvudu's staff is almost entirely in-house, featuring Random House employees across several disciplines, including editorial, art, publicity, and web production. Suvudu also uses content from a handful of freelance bloggers as well as posts by authors.

In February 2009, Suvudu was named one of MediaBistro's Six Stellar Publishing Company Blogs. In naming the site, MediaBistro wrote:

"For science fiction and fantasy fans, Random House's Suvudu has grown into a fan-focused website with a fairly active comments section--a rare sense of community for a publisher blog."

Types of content
Suvudu offers several different types of content regularly, including live author chats, author interviews, and feature articles.

Live author chats
Authors who have appeared are:
 Kelley Armstrong
 Suvudu Live Chat: Paranormal Roundtable
 Christopher Paolini
 Christopher Paolini and Terry Brooks Live Chat, including a follow-up Q&A with additional questions from the chat: Chat follow-up: Christopher Paolini answers your questions
 Terry Brooks
 Christopher Paolini and Terry Brooks Live Chat, including a follow-up Q&A from his chat with Christopher Paolini with additional questions from the chat: Chat follow-up: Terry Brooks answers your questions
 Terry Brooks Live Chat
 R. A. Salvatore, author chat
 Eoin Colfer, author chat
 Naomi Novik and Scott Westerfeld, Naomi Novik and Scott Westerfeld Live Chat
 China Miéville, author chat
 Peter Brett
 Peter Brett & Robert Redick Author Chat
 Suvudu's Live RPG
 Robert V.S. Redick, author of The Red Wolf Conspiracy, Peter Brett & Robert Redick Author Chat
 Dave Roman and Raina Telgemeier, Dave Roman & Raina Telgemeier Author Chat
 David Anthony Durham, author chat
 Daniel Wallace, author of many Star Wars Essential Guides, and Jason Fry, co-author of Star Wars Essential Atlas
 Jason Fry and Dan Wallace Live Chat
 Harry Connolly, author chat
 Nina Matsumoto, Eisner Award-winning artist and author, author chat
 Diana Rowland
 Suvudu's Live RPG
 Suvudu's Paranormal Roundtable
 Ari Marmell
 Suvudu's Live RPG
 Carolyn Crane
 Suvudu's Paranormal Roundtable
 Lucy A. Snyder
 Suvudu's Paranormal Roundtable
 Jenna Black
 Suvudu's Paranormal Roundtable
 Alex Prentiss
 Suvudu's Paranormal Roundtable

Feature articles
Suvudu features a number of recurring feature articles and series. They are:

'365 Days of Manga' by Jason Thompson
Author and blogger Jason Thompson posts daily manga reviews under the feature headline "365 Days of Manga." When launched on September 16, 2009, Thompson wrote that the feature would be "the online continuation of (his book) Manga: The Complete Guide!" The feature is planned to run one year and will encompass many different types of manga. The reviews are generally short, running only one paragraph, and conclude with each featured manga title being assigned a star value with a maximum of four stars possible for work deemed to be of the highest quality.

'New releases'
Posted every Tuesday, to coincide with the publication schedules for Random House, this post gives an overview of the books that will be newly available that week. The post also includes relevant genre release news for other books, movies, DVD releases, and video games of note.

'What I Learned This Week' by Betsy Mitchell
Betsy Mitchell, editor-in-chief of Del Rey books, contributes articles in this series relating various items and/or lessons related to her work.  These have included details about forthcoming books and projects ("What Diana Gabaldon's Jamie Fraser really looks like!" ), tips on writing and publication ("A good cover letter is hard to find (part 1)", "A good cover letter is hard to find (part 2)", and "The Importance of First Sentences"  to name a few), as well as musings and ruminations on the science fiction and fantasy genres ("How hard it is to come up with a great title!", "Why I Say No", and "The Debate Over DRM" ).

Author interviews and readings
Suvudu routinely conducts author interviews, typically involving Random House authors, though occasionally including outside authors as well. Some interviews are quick, five-question pieces focusing on an author's latest project or writing advice, while others are more in-depth. Suvudu also uses personal video recorders to record video interviews with authors, typically at events such as author readings or conventions.

Additionally, Suvudu has recorded and posted readings from several authors including Terry Brooks, Steven Erikson, Brian Sanderson, Naomi Novik, R. A. Salvatore, Jacqueline Carey, and Dan Simmons.

Suvudu Free Story Library
Suvudu began a Free Library program on March 4, 2009. The program offered the first book in a series by Random House, Inc., authors for free in a variety of formats, such as Stanza, Rich Text Files, and PDF files.  Partnering with Random House in this effort, prices were also reduced to free on Amazon (for Kindle readers), Sony (for Sony Readers), and Barnes & Noble (Nook).

Over time, the Free Library also began to include original short fiction, including fiction from The Magazine of Fantasy & Science Fiction as the result of a partnership between the two entities.  On January 8, 2010, Suvudu and the Magazine of Fantasy & Science Fiction announced their new partnership saying:

"An agreement between the two allows Suvudu's visitors access to one story from each issue of the magazine via Suvudu's Free Library, which also offers full-length novels from the Del Rey, Spectra, and other Random House lists."

References

External links
 Suvudu.com
 Random House

Random House
Internet properties established in 2008